Franck L'Hostis (born 3 April 1990) is a French professional footballer who plays as a goalkeeper for  club Bourg-en-Bresse.

Career
A youth product of Monaco, L'Hostis gained first-team playing time on loan at Martigues for the 2011–12 season. He then spent two years as first-choice goalkeeper at Amiens, before joining Clermont in July 2014. He made his full professional debut a few weeks later, in a 2–1 Ligue 2 defeat against Brest.

L'Hostis signed for Le Puy in the summer of 2017, and played there for three seasons, before moving to Orléans in June 2020. In 2022, he signed for Bourg-en-Bresse.

Honours
Individual
Toulon Tournament Best Goalkeeper: 2011

References

External links
 
 
 Franck L'Hostis foot-national.com Profile

1990 births
Living people
French footballers
Association football goalkeepers
Footballers from Nîmes
Ligue 2 players
Championnat National players
Championnat National 2 players
Championnat National 3 players
Nîmes Olympique players
Stade Beaucairois players
AC Arlésien players
AS Monaco FC players
FC Martigues players
Amiens SC players
Clermont Foot players
Le Puy Foot 43 Auvergne players
US Orléans players
Football Bourg-en-Bresse Péronnas 01 players